Borka Grubor is a politician in Serbia. She has served in the National Assembly of Serbia since 2016 as a member of the Serbian Progressive Party.

Early life and career
Grubor is a medical doctor. Prior to her election to the National Assembly, she served as deputy leader of the Progressive Party group in the Loznica municipal assembly.

Parliamentarian
Grubor received the 102nd position on the Progressive Party's Aleksandar Vučić – Serbia Is Winning electoral list in the 2016 Serbian parliamentary election and was elected when the list won a majority with 131 out of 250 mandates. She is currently a member of the parliamentary environmental protection committee; a deputy member of the committee on human and minority rights, and gender equality and the health and family committee; and a member of the parliamentary friendship groups with Australia, Austria, Azerbaijan, Belarus, China, Georgia, Germany, Japan, Kazakhstan, Russia, Slovenia, Sweden, and Switzerland.

References

1960 births
Living people
Members of the National Assembly (Serbia)
People from Loznica
Serbian Progressive Party politicians